Leonard King or Len King may refer to:
 Leonard William King (1869–1919), English archaeologist and Assyriologist
 Len King (1925–2011), South Australian politician, lawyer and judge
 Len King (cricket umpire) (born 1941), Australian cricket umpire
 Leonard King (basketball) (born 1966), American and New Zealand basketball player
 Leonard King (drummer), American jazz drummer who played on several albums with James Carter in the mid-2000s
 Leonard King (athlete) (born 1997), Australian sprinter